Cezar Bădiţă (born 12 April 1979 in Bucharest) is an international medley swimmer from Romania, who represented his native country at the 2000 Summer Olympics in Sydney, Australia. Prior to that tournament, at the 2000 European Aquatics Championships in Helsinki, Finland, he won the silver medal at the 200 m individual medley.

At the 2003 World Championships, he swam to Romanian Records in the 200 and 400 IMs (2:01.58 and 4:19.72).

See also
List of doping cases in sport

References
 Profile on Romanian Olympic Committee
 

1979 births
Living people
Romanian male medley swimmers
Doping cases in swimming
Romanian sportspeople in doping cases
Olympic swimmers of Romania
Swimmers at the 2000 Summer Olympics
Sportspeople from Bucharest
European Aquatics Championships medalists in swimming